Angadical  is a village in Pathanamthitta district in the Indian state of Kerala.

Demographics
 Indian census, Angadical had a population of 12,600 with 5,911 males and 6,689 females.

References

Sources 

Villages in Pathanamthitta district